Olivier Baroux (born 5 January 1964) is a French actor, comedian, writer and director who has acted both on stage and on screen. He first became known in forming with Kad Merad, the duo Kad & Olivier then went solo, while finding Kad regularly. Baroux's movies on Le Tuche is inspired by the hurdles of the American dream. He is married to his wife Coralie since 2009. Baroux is set to appear in Les Tuche 3, with filming beginning in August 2018.

Filmography

Actor

Writer & Director

Voice

External links

References

1964 births
Living people
Writers from Caen
French male film actors
French male television actors
20th-century French male actors
21st-century French male actors
French film directors
French male screenwriters
French screenwriters
Actors from Caen
Mass media people from Caen